North Skunk River Bridge is located northeast of New Sharon, Iowa, United States. The Mahaska and the Poweshiek County Boards of Supervisors met in New Sharon in February 1919 to discuss building a new bridge to be built along the county line. The two counties split $40,000 in costs, with the citizens of New Sharon and vicinity paying the remaining $10,000. The truss bridge was designed by the Iowa State Highway Commission, and constructed by the Iowa Bridge Company. It was completed in 1920, and was moved to its present location sometime later. Even though it is no longer in its historic location, the bridge was listed on the National Register of Historic Places in 1998 as the longest pinned connected truss bridge in Iowa.

References

Bridges completed in 1920
Bridges in Mahaska County, Iowa
Truss bridges in Iowa
National Register of Historic Places in Mahaska County, Iowa
Road bridges on the National Register of Historic Places in Iowa
Relocated buildings and structures in Iowa
Truss bridges in the United States